The term Negrito refers to several diverse ethnic groups who inhabit isolated parts of Southeast Asia and the Andaman Islands. Populations often described as Negrito include: the Andamanese peoples (including the Great Andamanese, the Onge, the Jarawa, and the Sentinelese) of the Andaman Islands, the Semang peoples (among them, the Batek people) of Peninsular Malaysia, the Maniq people of Southern Thailand, as well as the Aeta of Luzon Island, Ati, and Tumandok of Panay Island, Agta of Sierra Madre and Mamanwa of Mindanao Island and about 30 other officially recognized ethnic groups in the Philippines.

Etymology
The word Negrito is the Spanish diminutive of negro, used to mean "little black person." This usage was coined by 16th-century Spanish missionaries operating in the Philippines, and was borrowed by other European travellers and colonialists across Austronesia to label various peoples perceived as sharing relatively small physical stature and dark skin. Contemporary usage of an alternative Spanish epithet, Negrillos, also tended to bundle these peoples with the pygmy peoples of Central Africa on the basis of perceived similarities in stature and complexion. (Historically, the label Negrito has also been used to refer to African pygmies.) The appropriateness of bundling peoples of different ethnicities by similarities in stature and complexion has been challenged.

Culture 

Most groups designated as "Negrito" lived as hunter-gatherers, while some also used agriculture, such as plant harvesting. Today most live assimilated to the majority population of their respective homeland. Discrimination and poverty are often problems, caused either by their lower social position, and or their hunter-gatherer lifestyles.

Origins

Based on perceived physical similarities, Negritos were once considered a single population of closely related people. However, genetic studies suggest that they consist of several separate groups descended from the same ancient East Eurasian meta-population which gave rise to modern East Asian peoples and Oceanian peoples, as well as displaying genetic heterogeneity. The Negritos form the indigenous population of Southeast Asia, but were largely absorbed by Austroasiatic- and Austronesian-speaking groups that migrated from southern East Asia into Mainland and Insular Southeast Asia with the Neolithic expansion. The remainders form minority groups in geographically isolated regions.

It has been found that the physical and morphological phenotypes of Negritos, such as short stature, a wide and snub nose, curly hair and dark skin, "are shaped by novel mechanisms for adaptation to tropical rainforests" through convergent evolution and positive selection, rather than a remnant of a shared common ancestor, as suggested previously by some researchers.

A Negrito-like population was mostly likely also present in Taiwan before the Neolithic expansion and must have persisted into historical times, as suggested by evidence from morphological features of human skeletal remains dating from around 6,000 years ago resembling Negritos (especially Aetas in northern Luzon), and further corroborated by Chinese reports from the Qing period and from tales of Taiwanese indigenous peoples about people with "dark skin, short-and-small body stature, frizzy hair, and occupation in forested mountains or remote caves".

See also

Notes

References

Further reading
 Evans, Ivor Hugh Norman. The Negritos of Malaya. Cambridge [Eng.]: University Press, 1937.
 
 Garvan, John M., and Hermann Hochegger. The Negritos of the Philippines. Wiener Beitrage zur Kulturgeschichte und Linguistik, Bd. 14. Horn: F. Berger, 1964.
 Hurst Gallery. Art of the Negritos. Cambridge, Massachusetts: Hurst Gallery, 1987.
 
 
 Schebesta, P., & Schütze, F. (1970). The Negritos of Asia. Human relations area files, 1–2. New Haven, Conn: Human Relations Area Files.
 Armando Marques Guedes (1996). Egalitarian Rituals. Rites of the Atta hunter-gatherers of Kalinga-Apayao, Philippines, Social and Human Sciences Faculty, Universidade Nova de Lisboa.
 Zell, Reg. About the Negritos: A Bibliography. Edition blurb, 2011.
 Zell, Reg. Negritos of the Philippines. The People of the Bamboo - Age - A Socio-Ecological Model. Edition blurb, 2011.
 Zell, Reg, John M. Garvan. An Investigation: On the Negritos of Tayabas. Edition blurb, 2011.

External links

 Negritos of Zambales—detailed book written by an American at the turn of the previous century holistically describing the Negrito culture
 Andaman.org: The Negrito of Thailand
 The Southeast Asian Negrito

 
Demographics of the Philippines
Ethnic groups in Malaysia
Ethnic groups in Thailand
Ethnic groups in the Andaman and Nicobar Islands
Ethnic groups in the Philippines
Indigenous peoples of South Asia
Indigenous peoples of Southeast Asia
Austronesian peoples